NGC 2301 is an open cluster  in the constellation Monoceros. It was discovered by William Herschel in 1786. It is visible through 7x50 binoculars and it is considered the best open cluster for small telescopes in the constellation. It is located 5° WNW of delta Monocerotis and 2° SSE of 18 Monocerotis. The brightest star of the cluster is an orange G8 subgiant star of 8.0 magnitude, but it is possible that it is a foreground star. The cluster contains also blue giants. The brightest main sequence star is a B9 star with magnitude 9.1.

References

External links 
 

2301
Monoceros (constellation)
Open clusters